Wotton and Abinger Commons is a   nature reserve south-west of Dorking in Surrey. It is managed by the Surrey Wildlife Trust. Part of it is in Leith Hill Site of Special Scientific Interest

Abinger Common, which was formerly a grazing heath, is a wood with sessile oak dominant and a shrub layer of holly and bilberry. Wotton Common has many paths and bridleways through calcareous grassland, heath and woodland.

The site has several entrances listed on the reserve website.

References

Surrey Wildlife Trust